The 20 meter club (20 metrin kerho in Finnish) is an unregistered Finnish association for Finnish shot putters who have put the shot more than  in an official competition using a  shot for men and a  for women.

The 20 meter club was founded on April 28, 1983, at Eerikkilä Sports Academy with six men being selected as members. One of the goals of the club is to promote the development of shot putting in Finland.

The club meets twice a year, once in the spring and once in the fall. In its fall meeting, the club awards the "Kultapoju" or Golden Boy to a promising shot putter. The Golden Boy is a brass shot that is slightly larger than the current standard shot, although it weighs less (orig. ). The last recipient to date was Niko Hauhia, who also received a EUR 500 stipend for training. The club also awards training grants in order to promote and help athletes develop.

Members 
As of July 2018, the club had 21 members. Of these, Seppo Simola, Jari Kuoppa, and Bo Grahn are deceased.

Members of the club and the first time they put the shot more than 20 m

See also

References

External links
 Official site 

Sports clubs in Finland
20 m
1983 establishments in Finland